Hindu deities are the gods and goddesses in Hinduism. The terms and epithets for deities within the diverse traditions of Hinduism vary, and include Deva, Devi, Ishvara, Ishvari, Bhagavān and Bhagavati.

The deities of Hinduism have evolved from the Vedic era (2nd millennium BCE) through the medieval era (1st millennium CE), regionally within Nepal, Pakistan, India and in Southeast Asia, and across Hinduism's diverse traditions. The Hindu deity concept varies from a personal god as in Yoga school of Hindu philosophy, to thirty-three major deities in the Vedas, to hundreds of deities mentioned in the Puranas of Hinduism. Illustrations of major deities include Vishnu, Lakshmi, Shiva, Parvati, Brahma and Saraswati. These deities have distinct and complex personalities, yet are often viewed as aspects of the same Ultimate Reality called Brahman. From ancient times, the idea of equivalence has been cherished for all Hindus, in its texts and in early 1st-millennium sculpture with concepts such as Harihara (Half Vishnu, Half Shiva) and Ardhanārīshvara (half Shiva, half Parvati), with myths and temples that feature them together, declaring they are the same. Major deities have inspired their own Hindu traditions, such as Vaishnavism, Shaivism and Shaktism, but with shared mythology, ritual grammar, theosophy, axiology and polycentrism. Some Hindu traditions, such as Smartism from the mid 1st millennium CE, have included multiple major deities as henotheistic manifestations of Saguna Brahman, and as a means to realizing Nirguna Brahman. In Samkhya philosophy, Devata or deities are considered as “natural sources of energy” who have Sattva as the dominant Guna.

Hindu deities are represented with various icons and anicons, in paintings and sculptures, called Murtis and Pratimas. Some Hindu traditions, such as ancient Charvakas, rejected all deities and concept of god or goddess, while 19th-century British colonial era movements such as the Arya Samaj and Brahmo Samaj rejected deities and adopted monotheistic concepts similar to Abrahamic religions. Hindu deities have been adopted in other religions such as Jainism, and in regions outside India, such as predominantly Buddhist Thailand and Japan, where they continue to be revered in regional temples or arts.

In ancient and medieval era texts of Hinduism, the human body is described as a temple, and deities are described to be parts residing within it, while the Brahman (Absolute Reality, God) is described to be the same, or of similar nature, as the Atman (Self), which Hindus believe is eternal and within every living being. Deities in Hinduism are as diverse as its traditions, and a Hindu can choose to be polytheistic, pantheistic, monotheistic, monistic, agnostic, atheistic, or humanist.

Devas and devis

Deities in Hinduism are referred to as Deva (masculine) and Devi (feminine). The root of these terms means "heavenly, divine, anything of excellence". 

In the earliest Vedic literature, all supernatural beings are called Asuras. By the late Vedic period (~500 BCE), benevolent supernatural beings are referred to as Deva-Asuras. In post-Vedic texts, such as the Puranas and the Itihasas of Hinduism, the Devas represent the good, and the Asuras the bad. In some medieval Indian literature, Devas are also referred to as Suras and contrasted with their equally powerful, but malevolent half-brothers referred to as the Asuras.

Hindu deities are part of Indian mythology, both Devas and Devis feature in one of many cosmological theories in Hinduism.

Characteristics of Vedic-era deities
In Vedic literature, Devas and Devis represent the forces of nature and some represent moral values (such as the Adityas, Varuna, and Mitra), each symbolizing the epitome of a specialized knowledge, creative energy, exalted and magical powers (Siddhis).

The most referred to Devas in the Rigveda are Indra, Agni (fire) and Soma, with "fire deity" called the friend of all humanity, it and Soma being the two celebrated in a yajna fire ritual that marks major Hindu ceremonies. Savitr, Vishnu, Rudra (later given the exclusive epithet of Shiva), and Prajapati (later Brahma) are gods and hence Devas.

The Vedas describes a number of significant Devis such as Ushas (dawn), Prithvi (earth), Aditi (cosmic moral order), Saraswati (river, knowledge), Vāc (sound), Nirṛti (destruction), Ratri (night), Aranyani (forest), and bounty goddesses such as Dinsana, Raka, Puramdhi, Parendi, Bharati, Mahi among others are mentioned in the Rigveda. Sri, also called Lakshmi, appears in late Vedic texts dated to be pre-Buddhist, but verses dedicated to her do not suggest that her characteristics were fully developed in the Vedic era. All gods and goddesses are distinguished in the Vedic times, but in the post-Vedic texts (~500 BCE to 200 CE), and particularly in the early medieval era literature, they are ultimately seen as aspects or manifestations of one Brahman, the Supreme power.

Ananda Coomaraswamy states that Devas and Asuras in the Vedic lore are similar to Angels-Theoi-Gods and Titans of Greek mythology, both are powerful but have different orientations and inclinations, the Devas representing the powers of Light and the Asuras representing the powers of Darkness in Hindu mythology. According to Coomaraswamy's interpretation of Devas and Asuras, both these natures exist in each human being, the tyrant and the angel is within each being, the best and the worst within each person struggles before choices and one's own nature, and the Hindu formulation of Devas and Asuras is an eternal dance between these within each person.

Characteristics of medieval-era deities
In the Puranas and the Itihasas with the embedded Bhagavad Gita, the Devas represent the good, and the Asuras the bad. According to the Bhagavad Gita (16.6–16.7), all beings in the universe have both the divine qualities (daivi sampad) and the demonic qualities (asuri sampad) within each. The sixteenth chapter of the Bhagavad Gita states that pure god-like saints are rare and pure demon-like evil are rare among human beings, and the bulk of humanity is multi-charactered with a few or many faults. According to Jeaneane Fowler, the Gita states that desires, aversions, greed, needs, emotions in various forms "are facets of ordinary lives", and it is only when they turn to lust, hate, cravings, arrogance, conceit, anger, harshness, hypocrisy, violence, cruelty and such negativity- and destruction-inclined that natural human inclinations metamorphose into something demonic (Asura).

The Epics and medieval era texts, particularly the Puranas, developed extensive and richly varying mythologies associated with Hindu deities, including their genealogies. Several of the Purana texts are named after major Hindu deities such as Vishnu, Shiva and Devi. Other texts and commentators such as Adi Shankara explain that Hindu deities live or rule over the cosmic body as well in the temple of human body. They remark that the Sun deity is the eyes, the Vāyu the nose, the Prajapati the sexual organs, the Lokapalas the ears, Chandra the mind, Mitra the inward breath, Varuna the outward breath, Indra the arms, Bṛhaspati the speech, Vishnu, whose stride is great, is the feet, and Māyā is the smile.

Symbolism
Edelmann states that gods and anti-gods of Hinduism are symbolism for spiritual concepts. For example, god Indra (a Deva) and the antigod Virocana (an Asura) question a sage for insights into the knowledge of the self. Virocana leaves with the first given answer, believing now he can use the knowledge as a weapon. In contrast, Indra keeps pressing the sage, churning the ideas, and learning about means to inner happiness and power. Edelmann suggests that the Deva-Asura dichotomies in Hindu mythology may be seen as "narrative depictions of tendencies within our selves". Hindu deities in Vedic era, states Mahoney, are those artists with "powerfully inward transformative, effective and creative mental powers".

In Hindu mythology, everyone starts as an Asura, born of the same father. "Asuras who remain Asura" share the character of powerful beings craving for more power, more wealth, ego, anger, unprincipled nature, force and violence. The "Asuras who become Devas" in contrast are driven by an inner voice, seek understanding and meaning, prefer moderation, principled behavior, aligned with Ṛta and Dharma, knowledge and harmony.

The god (Deva) and antigod (Asura), states Edelmann, are also symbolically the contradictory forces that motivate each individual and people, and thus Deva-Asura dichotomy is a spiritual concept rather than mere genealogical category or species of being. In the Bhāgavata Purana, saints and gods are born in families of Asuras, such as Mahabali and Prahlada, conveying the symbolism that motivations, beliefs and actions rather than one's birth and family circumstances define whether one is Deva-like or Asura-like.

Ishvara

Another Hindu term that is sometimes translated as deity is Ishvara, or alternatively various deities are described, state Sorajjakool et al., as "the personifications of various aspects of one and the same Ishvara". The term Ishvara has a wide range of meanings that depend on the era and the school of Hinduism. In ancient texts of Indian philosophy, Ishvara means supreme Self, Brahman (Highest Reality), ruler, king or husband depending on the context. In medieval era texts, Ishvara means God, Supreme Being, personal god, or special Self depending on the school of Hinduism.

Among the six systems of Hindu philosophy, Samkhya and Mimamsa do not consider the concept of Ishvara, i.e., a supreme being, relevant. Yoga, Vaisheshika, Vedanta and Nyaya schools of Hinduism discuss Ishvara, but assign different meanings.

Early Nyaya school scholars considered the hypothesis of a deity as a creator God with the power to grant blessings, boons and fruits; but these early Nyaya scholars then rejected this hypothesis, and were non-theistic or atheists. Later scholars of Nyaya school reconsidered this question and offered counter arguments for what is Ishvara and various arguments to prove the existence of omniscient, omnipresent, omnipotent deity (God).

Vaisheshika school of Hinduism, as founded by Kanada in 1st millennium BCE, neither required nor relied on creator deity. Later Vaisheshika school adopted the concept of Ishvara, states Klaus Klostermaier, but as an eternal God who co-exists in the universe with eternal substances and atoms, but He "winds up the clock, and lets it run its course".

Ancient Mimamsa scholars of Hinduism questioned what is Ishvara (deity, God)? They considered a deity concept unnecessary for a consistent philosophy and moksha (soteriology).

In Samkhya school of Hindu philosophy, Isvara is neither a creator-God, nor a savior-God. This is called one of the several major atheistic schools of Hinduism by some scholars. Others, such as Jacobsen, state that Samkhya is more accurately described as non-theistic. Deity is considered an irrelevant concept, neither defined nor denied, in Samkhya school of Hindu philosophy.

In Yoga school of Hinduism, it is any "personal deity" (Ishta Deva or Ishta Devata) or "spiritual inspiration", but not a creator God. Whicher explains that while Patanjali's terse verses in the Yogasutras can be interpreted both as theistic or non-theistic, Patanjali's concept of Isvara in Yoga philosophy functions as a "transformative catalyst or guide for aiding the yogin on the path to spiritual emancipation".

The Advaita Vedanta school of Hinduism asserted that there is no dualistic existence of deity (or deities). There is no otherness nor distinction between Jiva and Ishvara. God (Ishvara, Brahman) is identical with the Atman (Self) within each human being in Advaita Vedanta school, and there is a monistic Universal Absolute Oneness that connects everyone and everything, states this school of Hinduism. This school, states Anantanand Rambachan, has "perhaps exerted the most widespread influence".

The Dvaita sub-school of Vedanta Hinduism, founded in medieval era, Ishvara is defined as a creator God that is distinct from Jiva (individual Selfs in living beings). In this school, God creates individual Selfs (Atman), but the individual Selfs never was and never will become one with God; the best it can do is to experience bliss by getting infinitely close to God.

Number of deities

Yāska, the earliest known language scholar of India (~500 BCE), notes Wilkins, mentions that there are three deities (Devas) according to the Vedas, "Agni (fire), whose place is on the earth; Vayu (wind), whose place is the air; and Surya (sun), whose place is in the sky". This principle of three worlds (or zones), and its multiples is found thereafter in many ancient texts. The Samhitas, which are the oldest layer of text in Vedas enumerate 33 devas, either 11 each for the three worlds, or as 12 Adityas, 11 Rudras, 8 Vasus and 2 Ashvins in the Brahmanas layer of Vedic texts.

The Rigveda states in hymn 1.139.11,

One or one-ness
Thirty-three koti (33 supreme) divinities are mentioned in other ancient texts, such as the Yajurveda. Most by far, are goddesses state Foulston and Abbott, suggesting "how important and popular goddesses are" in Hindu culture. Scholars state all deities are typically viewed in Hinduism as "emanations or manifestation of genderless principle called Brahman, representing the many facets of Ultimate Reality".

This concept of God in Hinduism "God, the universe, human beings and all else is essentially one thing" and everything is connected oneness, the same god is in every human being as Atman, the eternal Self. Parallels between Allah in Islam or Ein Sof in Kabbalah and Brahman have been drawn by many scholars in the past as well as in recent times.

Iconography and practices

Hinduism has an ancient and extensive iconography tradition, particularly in the form of Murti (Sanskrit: मूर्ति, IAST: Mūrti), or Vigraha or Pratima. A Murti is itself not the god in Hinduism, but it is an image of god and represents emotional and religious value. A literal translation of Murti as idol is incorrect, states Jeaneane Fowler, when idol is understood as superstitious end in itself. Just like the photograph of a person is not the real person, a Murti is an image in Hinduism but not the real thing, but in both cases the image reminds of something of emotional and real value to the viewer. When a person worships a Murti, it is assumed to be a manifestation of the essence or spirit of the deity, the worshipper's spiritual ideas and needs are meditated through it, yet the idea of ultimate reality or Brahman is not confined in it.

A Murti of a Hindu deity is typically made by carving stone, wood working, metal casting or through pottery. Medieval era texts describing their proper proportions, positions and gestures include the Puranas, Agamas and Samhitas particularly the Shilpa Shastras. The expressions in a Murti vary in diverse Hindu traditions, ranging from Ugra symbolism to express destruction, fear and violence (Durga, Parvati, Kali), as well as Saumya symbolism to express joy, knowledge and harmony (Parvati, Saraswati, Lakshmi). Saumya images are most common in Hindu temples. Other Murti forms found in Hinduism include the Linga.

A Murti is an embodiment of the divine, the Ultimate Reality or Brahman to some Hindus. In religious context, they are found in Hindu temples or homes, where they may be treated as a beloved guest and serve as a participant of Puja rituals in Hinduism. A murti is installed by priests, in Hindu temples, through the Prana Pratishtha ceremony, whereby state Harold Coward and David Goa, the "divine vital energy of the cosmos is infused into the sculpture" and then the divine is welcomed as one would welcome a friend. In other occasions, it serves as the center of attention in annual festive processions and these are called Utsava Murti.

Temple and worship

In Hinduism, deities and their icons may be hosted in a Hindu temple, within a home or as an amulet. The worship performed by Hindus is known by a number of regional names, such as Puja. This practice in front of a murti may be elaborate in large temples, or be a simple song or mantra muttered in home, or offering made to sunrise or river or symbolic anicon of a deity. Archaeological evidence of deity worship in Hindu temples trace Puja rituals to Gupta Empire era (~4th century CE). In Hindu temples, various pujas may be performed daily at various times of the day; in other temples, it may be occasional.

The Puja practice is structured as an act of welcoming, hosting, honoring the deity of one's choice as one's honored guest, and remembering the spiritual and emotional significance the deity represents to the devotee. Jan Gonda, as well as Diana L. Eck, states that a typical Puja involves one or more of 16 steps (Shodasha Upachara) traceable to ancient times: the deity is invited as a guest, the devotee hosts and takes care of the deity as an honored guest, praise (hymns) with Dhupa or Aarti along with food (Naivedhya) is offered to the deity, after an expression of love and respect the host takes leave, and with affection expresses good bye to the deity. The worship practice may also involve reflecting on spiritual questions, with image serving as support for such meditation.

Deity worship (Bhakti), visiting temples and Puja rites are not mandatory and is optional in Hinduism; it is the choice of a Hindu, it may be a routine daily affair for some Hindus, periodic ritual or infrequent for some. Worship practices in Hinduism are as diverse as its traditions, and a Hindu can choose to be polytheistic, pantheistic, monotheistic, monistic, agnostic, atheistic, or humanist.

Examples

Major deities have inspired a vast genre of literature such as the Puranas and Agama texts as well their own Hindu traditions, but with shared mythology, ritual grammar, theosophy, axiology and polycentrism. Vishnu and his avatars are at the foundation of Vaishnavism, Shiva for Shaivism, Devi for Shaktism, and some Hindu traditions such as Smarta traditions who revere multiple major deities (five) as henotheistic manifestations of Brahman (absolute metaphysical Reality).

While there are diverse deities in Hinduism, states Lawrence, "Exclusivism – which maintains that only one's own deity is real" is rare in Hinduism. Julius Lipner, and other scholars, state that pluralism and "polycentrism" – where other deities are recognized and revered by members of different "denominations", has been the Hindu ethos and way of life.

Trimurti and Tridevi

The concept of Triad (or Trimurti, Trinity) makes a relatively late appearance in Hindu literature, or in the second half of 1st millennium BCE. The idea of triad, playing three roles in the cosmic affairs, is typically associated with Brahma, Vishnu and Shiva (also called Mahesh); however, this is not the only triad in Hindu literature. Other triads include Tridevi, of three goddesses – Lakshmi, Saraswati and Parvati in the text Devi Mahatmya, in the Shakta tradition, who further assert that Devi is the Brahman (Ultimate Reality) and it is her energy that empowers Brahma, Vishnu and Shiva. The other triads, formulated as deities in ancient Indian literature, include Sun (creator), Air (sustainer) and Fire (destroyer); Prana (creator), Food (sustainer) and Time (destroyer). These triads, states Jan Gonda, are in some mythologies grouped together without forming a Trinity, and in other times represented as equal, a unity and manifestations of one Brahman. In the Puranas, for example, this idea of threefold "hypostatization" is expressed as follows,

The triad appears in Maitrayaniya Upanishad, for the first time in recognized roles known ever since, where they are deployed to present the concept of three Guṇa – the innate nature, tendencies and inner forces found within every being and everything, whose balance transform and keeps changing the individual and the world. It is in the medieval Puranic texts, Trimurti concepts appears in various context, from rituals to spiritual concepts. The Bhagavad Gita, in verses 9.18, 10.21-23 and 11.15, asserts that the triad or trinity is manifestation of one Brahman, which Krishna affirms himself to be. However, suggests Bailey, the mythology of triad is "not the influence nor the most important one" in Hindu traditions, rather the ideologies and spiritual concepts develop on their own foundations. The triad, with Brahma creating, Vishnu preserving and Shiva destroying, balances the functioning of the whole universe.

Avatars of Hindu deities

Hindu mythology has nurtured the concept of Avatar, which represents the descent of a deity on earth. This concept is commonly translated as "incarnation", and is an "appearance" or "manifestation".

The concept of Avatar is most developed in Vaishnavism tradition, and associated with Vishnu, particularly with Rama and Krishna. Vishnu takes numerous avatars in Hindu mythology. He becomes female, during the Samudra manthan, in the form of Mohini, to resolve a conflict between the Devas and Asuras. His male avatars include Matsya, Kurma, Varaha, Narasimha, Vamana, Parashurama, Rama, Krishna, Buddha, and Kalki. Various texts, particularly the Bhagavad Gita, discuss the idea of Avatar of Vishnu appearing to restore the cosmic balance whenever the power of evil becomes excessive and causes persistent oppression in the world.

In Shaktism traditions, the concept appears in its legends as the various manifestations of Devi, the Divine Mother principal in Hinduism. The avatars of Devi or Parvati include Durga and Kali, who are particularly revered in eastern states of India, as well as Tantra traditions. Twenty one avatars of Shiva are also described in Shaivism texts, but unlike Vaishnava traditions, Shaiva traditions have focussed directly on Shiva rather than the Avatar concept.

Major regional and pan-Indian Hindu deities

See also
 Hindu denominations
 Hindu iconography
 Hindu mythology
 Puranas
 List of Hindu deities
 Rigvedic deities

Notes

References

Citations

Sources
 Daniélou, Alain (1991) [1964]. The Myths and Gods of India. Inner Traditions, Vermont, USA. .
 Fuller, C. J. (2004). The Camphor Flame: Popular Hinduism and Society in India. Princeton University Press, New Jersey. .
 Harman, William, "Hindu Devotion". In: Contemporary Hinduism: Ritual, Culture, and Practice, Robin Rinehard, ed. (2004) .
 Kashyap, R. L. Essentials of Krishna and Shukla Yajurveda; SAKSI, Bangalore, Karnataka .
 
 Pattanaik, Devdutt (2009). 7 Secrets from Hindu Calendar Art. Westland, India. .
 
 
 
 
 
 Swami Bhaskarananda, (1994). Essentials of Hinduism. (Viveka Press) .
 Vastu-Silpa Kosha, Encyclopedia of Hindu Temple architecture and Vastu. S. K. Ramachandara Rao, Delhi, Devine Books, (Lala Murari Lal Chharia Oriental series)  (Set)
 Werner, Karel. A Popular Dictionary of Hinduism. Curzon Press, 1994. .

Further reading
 Chandra, Suresh (1998). Encyclopaedia of Hindu Gods and Goddesses. Sarup & Sons, New Delhi, India. .
 Pattanaik, Devdutt (2003). Indian mythology: tales, symbols, and rituals from the heart of the Subcontinent. Inner Traditions / Bear & Company. .
 Kinsley, David. Hindu Goddesses: Vision of the Divine Feminine in the Hindu Religious Traditions. Motilal Banarsidass, New Delhi, India. .

External links

 A chart of the main Hindu deities (with pictures)
Collection: "Hindu Gods and Goddesses" from the University of Michigan Museum of Art
"Deities in Stone: Hindu Sculpture from the Collections of the Asian Art Museum" exhibition at the SFO Museum
"Seeing the Divine in Hindu Art" exhibition at the Museum of Art and Archaeology at the University of Missouri

 
Characters in Hindu mythology